Princess Clara von Hatzfeldt zu Wildenburg ( Clara Elizabeth Prentice, then Prentice-Huntington) (March 13, 1860 – December 18, 1928) was an American heiress and member of the Huntington family who married into the princely House of Hatzfeld.

Early life

Clara Elizabeth Prentice was born in Sacramento, California on 13 March 1860. She was the biological daughter of Edwin D. Prentice (1821–1862), a Sacramento grocer, and Clara ( Stoddard) Prentice (1824–1912). After her father's death, Clara was adopted by her aunt, Elizabeth Stillman ( Stoddard) Huntington (1823–1883), and her husband, industrialist and railway magnate Collis P. Huntington. Clara's older sister, Mary Alice Prentice, was the wife of Collis' nephew Henry E. Huntington, with whom she had four children.

After Elizabeth died in 1883, Collis married Arabella Yarrington in 1884. Arabella had a son named Archer that Collis also adopted. Collis died in 1900, and Clara received a "fortune of more than $2,000,000", a sum which was later increased to $6,000,000 by agreement with Collis' widow. In 1910, Clara's sister Mary and Henry divorced and, in 1913, Henry married his uncle Collis' widow Arabella in what was a shock to society at the time.

Personal life

While traveling through Spain with Mrs. John Sherwood, Clara met Prince Franz Edmund Joseph Gabriel Vitus von Hatzfeldt zu Wildenburg (1853–1910), who "became infatuated with her. For some time he has followed her about most devotedly." A noted race-horse owner and "at one time Secretary in one of the embassies in Washington", Prince Franz von Hatzfeldt was born in Bavaria and was a son of Alfred, Prince von Hatzfeldt-Wildenburg (son of Sophie von Hatzfeldt) and Countess Gabriele von Dietrichstein-Proskau-Leslie (a daughter of Joseph Franz, Prince of Dietrichstein). He was also a nephew of Count Paul von Hatzfeldt, the German Ambassador to the United Kingdom. He was described by The New York Times on August 21, 1889, as follows:

He is tall and fair, with stooping shoulders. No particular fault has ever been found with the Prince, except a chronic impecuniosity and a decided inclination to contract debts that there was no prospect of paying, except he should capture such a prize as he has caught. In short, he has exhibited what has been aptly termed by a favorite American comedian 'a wine taste on a beer income.' His obligations are set by London clubmen, by whom he was always considered a jolly good fellow, at about 4,000,000£ but had not enough money to cut much of a figure. He has been a patron of all the fashionable European watering places, and has been most assiduous in cultivating the acquaintance of rich American girls at Monte Carlo, Baden, Homburg, and other resorts. He has figured conspicuously in several unsavory gambling episodes, one of which, about two years ago, attracted such widespread attention as to cause the Prince to retire for a time. His father and mother are extremely popular both at Berlin and Vienna, but the Prince is regarded as a black sheep and has severed his connection with both the Diplomatic Service and the army."

Despite the press's articles about Prince Franz von Hatzfeldt, on October 28, 1889, Clara was married to him by the Bishop of Emmaus at St Wilfrid's Chapel at Brompton Oratory in London.  After their marriage, they lived at Hatzfeldt Castle at Schönstein-on-the-Rhine before leasing Draycot House at Draycot Cerne in Wiltshire, England between 1896 and 1915.

Prince Franz died in London on November 4, 1910, seven months before his father. As they had no children, his princely rights and estates were inherited by his cousin, Count Hermann von Hatzfeldt-Wildenburg (the only son of Count Paul von Hatzfeldt), who was the last Prince of Hatzfeld-Wildenburg.

Society life
After her marriage, Princess Clara became prominent in aristocratic German and English society and was "the leading American hostess in London for many years." She attended Mrs. Adair's Fancy Dress Ball in London on 11 May 1903 costumed as Queen Esther wearing "...yellow chiffon with jewelled embroidery; a rose-coloured veil depending from an Oriental head-dress... sandals, and toe-rings on bare feet."

She collected jewelry, including a famous aquamarine necklace given to Emma Hartmann of White Lodge by Edward VII when he was Prince of Wales. Clara acquired it in 1910 and gifted it to her step-mother Arabella.

Death and estate battle
After a chill contracted a week earlier, Princess Clara died in England on December 18, 1928. Her funeral was held at the Roman Catholic Church in Windsor, where she was a parishioner for many years.

The principal heir of her estate was her friend, Philip Champion de Crespigny of Champion Lodge (younger brother of Claude Champion de Crespigny), who received $500,000 of the $1,000,000 trust established for the Princess by her uncle, two-thirds of her stock in Central South African Sands and Mines Ltd. and the residuary estate. Champion de Crespigny was named co-executor of her estate with the Central Union Trust Company of New York and Henry Beauchamp Harrison of London, who was to receive the balance of the stock, $150,000 of the fund as well as jewelry and other personal effects.

Almost immediately after the will was filed, her extended family who were all excluded from the estate, began challenging the validity of the will and its codicils. In 1931, her estate was valued at $1,585,694 after the settlement of the will contest.

References
Notes

Sources

External links
 Princess Francis Edmund von Hatzfeldt, née Clara Huntington at The Lafayette Negative Archive

1860 births
1928 deaths
People from Sacramento, California
Huntington family
House of Hatzfeld